Julien Kossi Denke (18 May 1958 – 16 March 2014), known as Wazo, was a Togo international football player.

Club career
Born in Lomé, Denké began playing club football for local side Aiglons de Lomé. After participating in the African Cup of Nations finals in Côte d'Ivoire, Wazo attempted to join an Ivorian club, however he was caught and repatriated to Togo.

In June 1984, Denké became the first Togolese footballer to move to Europe when he joined French Ligue 2 club LB Châteauroux. The following season, he joined Ligue 2 rivals FC Bourges. He had a brief spell in Switzerland before finishing his career with Sud Nivernais Imphy Decize.

International career
Denké made 70 appearances for the Togo national football team, including one FIFA World Cup qualifying match. He played for Togo at the 1984 African Cup of Nations finals.

After retiring from playing, Wazo became a technical adviser to the Togo national football team at the 1998 African Cup of Nations finals.

Personal
Denké died in France at age 55.

References

External links
 
 Kossi Wazo Denké at Cintana
 

1958 births
2014 deaths
Togolese footballers
Togolese expatriate footballers
Togo international footballers
Togolese expatriate sportspeople in France
Expatriate footballers in France
1984 African Cup of Nations players
LB Châteauroux players
Bourges 18 players
Association football defenders
21st-century Togolese people